Ophelia Magdalena Dahl (born 12 May 1964) is a British-American social justice and health care advocate. Dahl co-founded Partners In Health (PIH), a Boston, Massachusetts-based non-profit health care organization dedicated to providing a "preferential option for the poor." She served as executive director for 16 years and has since chaired its board of directors.

As a co-founder and key member of the PIH team, Dahl was featured prominently in Mountains Beyond Mountains: The Quest of Dr. Paul Farmer, a Man Who Would Cure the World, Tracy Kidder's book describing the work of the organisation and the life of Dr. Farmer. In December 2006, Ophelia Dahl and Paul Farmer received the Union Medal from Union Theological Seminary in New York. Dahl and the Partners in Health team is featured in the 2017 documentary film, Bending The Arc.

Career 
In 1983, Dahl first encountered Paul Farmer, the future co-founder of PIH, as an eighteen-year-old volunteer in Haiti. Dahl has served as Executive Director of PIH from 2001-2005, and now chairs the Board of Directors, where the organisation continues to build health care systems and raise standards in global health in remote areas of the world.

Since the development of PIH in 1987, the organisation has expanded its health care services around the planet. Under the leadership of Dahl, PIH is strengthening the public health system for over 800,000 people in Rwanda. Other countries include Malawi, Mexico, Russia, and Lesotho, where PIH works with the countries' respective ministries of health to fight diseases in certain rural areas. PIH provides critical health care services through programs for cancer, chronic diseases, cholera, HIV/AIDS, surgery, women's health, child health, community health workers, mental health, and tuberculosis. As of now, PIH works in more than 60 hospital centers around the world, with more than 12,000 colleagues involved.

In 2011, she was named by the Boston Globe as one of the three Bostonians of the Year, along with Paul Farmer and a senior member of Partners in Health, Louise Ivers. This was mainly due to her role in the charity's response to the 2010 Haiti earthquake. She has also been selected by Social Capital Inc. (SCI) as a 2011 SCI Idealist Award recipient, to be given on 30 March 2011.

In 2013, Dahl was a distinguished speaker at the Madeleine Korbel Albright Institute for Global Affairs.

In 2019, Dahl was awarded the honorary degree Doctor of Laws by Williams College.

Personal life 
Dahl was born on May 12, 1964 at John Radcliffe Hospital in Oxford, United Kingdom. Dahl is the second-youngest child of actress Patricia Neal and author Roald Dahl. Dahl contributed to the 2003 book The Roald Dahl Treasury, a collection of her father's stories, memoirs, letters and poetry, and is currently writing a memoir of her father. She is a trustee and vice president of the Roald Dahl Museum and Story Centre, a registered charity with the mission of "telling Roald Dahl’s life story, to care for his archive and to promote a love of creative writing in everyone." She also is the chair of Dahl & Dahl LLP, which manages the literary estate of her father.

In 1994, Dahl graduated from Wellesley College as a Davis Scholar and delivered Wellesley's 2006 commencement address.

Dahl has one son with her wife Lisa Frantzis.

References

Further reading
 Partners In Health Director's Message
 Telegraph Article
 Ophelia Dahl's Union Medal acceptance speech podcast
 Ophelia Dahl  Video produced by Makers: Women Who Make America

1964 births
Living people
People from Oxford
English activists
English women activists
English humanitarians
English LGBT people
Partners in Health
Wellesley College alumni
English people of American descent
English people of Norwegian descent
English people of Welsh descent
Ophelia